The Jwauijeong  was the Second State Councillor of the Uijeongbu (State Council), subordinate in rank only to the Yeonguijeong, during the Joseon Dynasty of Korea (1392  -1910). Only one official was appointed to the position and was variously referred to as Jwasang, Jwajeongseung, Jwagyu, Jwahap, or Jwadae. 

Since its foundation, the Joseon Dynasty, which had succeeded to the state apparatus of the Goryeo Dynasty (918 – 1392), had been adjusting its government organization. In 1400, the second year after King Jeongjong came to the throne, he renamed the Dopyeonguisasa (都評議事司; Privy Council), the highest organ in charge of the state affairs of Goryeo, to Uijeongbu and created the post of Jwauijeong along with that of Uuijeong (Third State Councillor). The three officials were collectively referred to as the Samjeongseung (Three top officials) or the Samuijeong (Three High Councilors).

List of the Left State Councillors

See also
State Council of Joseon
Yeonguijeong
Uuijeong
Yukjo
Joseon Dynasty politics

References

Joseon dynasty
Politics of Korea